The Great Seal of the State of Wisconsin is a seal used by the secretary of state to authenticate all the governor’s official acts, except laws.  It consists of the state coat of arms, with the words "Great Seal of the State of Wisconsin" above it and 13 stars, representing the original states, below it.

 Top:
 Forward, the state motto
 A badger, the state animal

Center: 

Top left: A plow, representing agriculture and farming
Top right: A pick and shovel, representing mining
Bottom left: An arm-and-hammer, representing manufacturing
Bottom right: An anchor, representing navigation
Center: The U.S. coat of arms, including the motto E pluribus unum
 The shield is supported by a sailor and a yeoman, representing labor on water and land
Bottom:
 A cornucopia, representing prosperity and abundance
 13 lead ingots, representing mineral wealth and the 13 original United States

The state seal emphasizes mining and shipping because at the time of Wisconsin's founding in 1848 the mining of lead and iron and shipping (via the Great Lakes and the Mississippi River) were major industries.

The Secretary of State of Wisconsin is the keeper of Wisconsin's great seal. The seal is displayed in all courtrooms in the state, often alongside the county seal.

Government seals of Wisconsin

Gallery

See also
Symbols of the State of Wisconsin
Flag of Wisconsin

References

Wisconsin
Symbols of Wisconsin
Wisconsin
Wisconsin
Wisconsin
Wisconsin
Wisconsin